Courtney Williams may refer to:

Courtney M. Williams (born 1994), American basketball player
Courtney Carl Williams (born 1991), Vincentian runner